Hasheem Thabeet (born Hashim Thabit Manka; 16 February 1987) is a Tanzanian professional basketball player for the TaiwanBeer HeroBears of the T1 League. He played college basketball for UConn before being drafted second overall in the 2009 NBA draft by the Memphis Grizzlies. His performance as a second overall draft pick has led many analysts to label him as one of the "biggest busts" in NBA history.

Early life
Thabeet did not begin to play basketball until the age of 15, when he began to watch pick-up games in Tanzania. When first recruited from Tanzania, Thabeet was fluent in Swahili but knew little English. He played high school basketball at Cypress Christian School in Houston, Texas where he graduated in 2006.

College career
As a freshman for the Connecticut Huskies, he averaged 6.2 points and 3.8 blocks per game. On 3 December 2006, Thabeet tied a UConn record for blocks in a game with 10. Thabeet was named to the 2007 All-Big East Rookie Team, along with teammate Jerome Dyson.

As a sophomore, he saw increased minutes and he averaged 10.5 points, 7.9 rebounds, 4.5 blocks on the season. On 5 January 2008, he tied his career high in blocks with 10 in the Huskies' 73–67 loss at University of Notre Dame. Thabeet was named Big East Defensive Player of the Year and to the All-Big East second team.

As a junior, Thabeet emerged on the national scene, averaging 13.6 points and 10.8 rebounds. He earned his first career triple-double against Providence College on 31 January 2009, with 15 points, 11 rebounds and 10 blocks. He finished with 152 blocks on the season. He was named Big East Defensive Player of the Year and was co-Big East Player of the Year with Pitt's DeJuan Blair. He was named second team All-America and National Defensive Player of the Year.

Thabeet surpassed the 1,000-point mark against Purdue on 26 March 2009. He was the third UConn player that season to do so (Jerome Dyson and A. J. Price were the others). Thabeet helped lead UConn to their first Final Four appearance since 2004.

In April 2009, Thabeet declared for the NBA draft, foregoing his final year of college eligibility.

Professional career

Memphis Grizzlies (2009–2011) 
Thabeet was selected with the second overall pick in 2009 NBA draft by the Memphis Grizzlies, ahead of two future NBA MVPs James Harden and Stephen Curry, becoming the first Tanzanian-born NBA player. On 13 December 2009, he had a season-high five blocks.

On 25 February 2010, he was assigned to the Dakota Wizards of the NBA Development League, becoming the tallest and then-highest-drafted player (surpassed by Anthony Bennett in 2015, the first overall pick in the 2013 NBA draft) to be sent to the D-League. On 8 March 2010, he was recalled by the Grizzlies.

Houston Rockets (2011–2012) 
On 24 February 2011, Thabeet was traded, along with a future first-round pick, to the Houston Rockets in exchange for Shane Battier and Ish Smith. On 21 March 2011, he was assigned with the Rio Grande Valley Vipers. On 11 April 2011, he was recalled by the Rockets.

Portland Trail Blazers (2012)
On 15 March 2012, Thabeet was traded, along with Jonny Flynn and a future second-round pick, to the Portland Trail Blazers in exchange for Marcus Camby.

Oklahoma City Thunder (2012–2014) 
On 11 July 2012, Thabeet signed with the Oklahoma City Thunder. On 26 November 2012, in a 114–69 win over the Charlotte Bobcats, Thabeet recorded his first career double-double with 13 points (a career high) and 10 rebounds.

Grand Rapids Drive (2014–2015) 
On 26 August 2014, Thabeet was traded to the Philadelphia 76ers in exchange for a trade exception and a 2015 protected second-round draft pick. On 1 September 2014, he was waived by the 76ers.

On 25 September 2014, Thabeet signed with the Detroit Pistons. However, he was later waived by the Pistons on 20 October 2014.

On 1 November 2014, Thabeet was acquired by the Grand Rapids Drive of the NBA Development League as an affiliate player of the Pistons. In 49 games for the Drive, he averaged 8.6 points and 6.2 rebounds per game.

In July 2015, Thabeet joined the NBA D-League Select Team for the 2015 NBA Summer League.

Yokohama B-Corsairs (2017–2018) 
On 29 September 2017, Thabeet signed with the Yokohama B-Corsairs of the Japanese B.League.

Fort Wayne Mad Ants (2019–2020) 
For the 2019–20 season, Thabeet signed with the Fort Wayne Mad Ants of the NBA G League. He was cut on 16 January 2020.

Hsinchu JKO Lioneers (2020–2021) 
On September 25, 2020, Thabeet signed with the Hsinchu JKO Lioneers of the Taiwanese P. League+. He was the league's rebounding leader, blocks leader and Defensive Player of Year for the 2020–21 season.

On October 28, 2021, Thabeet signed with the Tainan TSG GhostHawks of the Taiwanese T1 League. Chien Wei-Cheng, the general manager of the Tainan TSG GhostHawks, indicated that Thabeet would not join the Tainan TSG GhostHawks on December 24.

Savio (2021) 
In 2021, Thabeet played for Savio in his native Tanzania, and guided the team to the Dar es Salaam Regional Basketball League (RBA) title and was named the Finals MVP.

TaiwanBeer HeroBears (2023–present) 
On March 8, 2023, TaiwanBeer HeroBears registered Thabeet as import player. On March 13, Thabeet signed with the TaiwanBeer HeroBears of the T1 League.

Career statistics

Regular season

|-
| style="text-align:left;"|
| style="text-align:left;"|Memphis
| 68 || 13 || 13.0 || .588 ||  || .581 || 3.6 || .2 || .2 || 1.3 || 3.1
|-
| style="text-align:left;"|
| style="text-align:left;"|Memphis
| 45 || 0 || 8.2 || .436 ||  || .543 || 1.7 || .1 || .2 || .3 || 1.2
|-
| style="text-align:left;"|
| style="text-align:left;"|Houston
| 2 || 0 || 2.0 || .000 ||  ||  || .0 || .0 || .0 || .5 || .0
|-
| style="text-align:left;"|
| style="text-align:left;"|Houston
| 5 || 0 || 4.6 || 1.000 ||  ||  || 1.4 || .0 || .0 || .4 || 1.2
|-
| style="text-align:left;"|
| style="text-align:left;"|Portland
| 15 || 3 || 7.7 || .444 ||  || .650 || 2.3 || .0 || .1 || .5 || 1.9
|-
| style="text-align:left;"|
| style="text-align:left;"|Oklahoma City
| 66 || 4 || 11.7 || .604 ||  || .604 || 3.0 || .2 || .5 || .9 || 2.4
|-
| style="text-align:left;"|
| style="text-align:left;"|Oklahoma City
| 23 || 0 || 8.3 || .565 ||  || .200 || 1.7 || .0 || .2 || .4 || 1.2
|- class="sortbottom"
| style="text-align:center;" colspan="2"|Career
| 224 || 20 || 10.5 || .567 ||  || .578 || 2.7 || .1 || .3 || .8 || 2.2

Playoffs

|-
| style="text-align:left;"|2013
| style="text-align:left;"|Oklahoma City
| 4 || 0 || 6.5 || .500 ||  ||  || 1.5 || .0 || .3 || .0 || .5
|-
| style="text-align:left;"|2014
| style="text-align:left;"|Oklahoma City
| 2 || 0 || 3.5 ||  ||  ||  || .0 || .0 || .0 || .0 || .0
|- class="sortbottom"
| style="text-align:center;" colspan="2"|Career
| 6 || 0 || 5.5 || .500 ||  ||  || 1.0 || .0 || .2 || .0 || .3

NBA G League

Source

Regular season

|-
| align="left"| 2009–10
| align="left" | Dakota
| 6 || 4 || 31.3 || .500 || – || .690 || 11.2 || .7 || .7 || 3.2 || 13.8
|-
| align="left" | 2010–11
| align="left" | Rio Grande
| 6 || 5 || 27.8 || .615 || – || .571 || 8.0 || .7 || .8 || 2.7 || 10.0
|-
| align="left" | 2014–15
| align="left" | Grand Rapids
| 48 || 42 || 22.3 || .593 || – || .654 || 6.2 || .4 || .4 || 2.4 || 8.6
|-
| align="left" | 2019–20
| align="left" | Fort Wayne
| 9 || 2 || 16.4 || .577 || – || .600 || 4.3 || .7 || .1 || 1.8 || 4.0
|-
| style="text-align:center;" colspan="2"| Career
| 68 || 53 || 22.8 || .582 || – || .652 || 6.6 || .4 || .4 || 2.4 || 8.6
|-

Playoffs

|-
| style="text-align:left;"| 2011
| style="text-align:left;"| Rio Grande
| 1 || 1 || 22.0 || .000 || – || .750 || 6.0 || 2.0 || .0 || 1.0 || 3.0

Personal life
Thabeet is Muslim and fasts during Ramadan.

See also

 List of tallest players in National Basketball Association history
 List of NCAA Division I men's basketball career blocks leaders

References

External links

1987 births
Living people
All-American college men's basketball players
Centers (basketball)
Dakota Wizards players
Tanzanian expatriate basketball people in Japan
Tanzanian expatriate basketball people in Taiwan
Tanzanian expatriate basketball people in the United States
Tanzanian expatriate sportspeople in China
Fort Wayne Mad Ants players
Grand Rapids Drive players
Houston Rockets players
Memphis Grizzlies draft picks
Memphis Grizzlies players
National Basketball Association players from Tanzania
Oklahoma City Thunder players
People from Dar es Salaam
Portland Trail Blazers players
Rio Grande Valley Vipers players
Tanzanian men's basketball players
Tanzanian Muslims
UConn Huskies men's basketball players
Yokohama B-Corsairs players
Hsinchu JKO Lioneers players
P. League+ imports
TaiwanBeer HeroBears players
T1 League imports